Josselin Ouanna was the defending champion, however he lost to Rubén Ramírez Hidalgo in the quarterfinals.
Michał Przysiężny defeated Ramírez Hidalgo in the final (4–6, 6–2, 6–3).

Seeds

Draw

Finals

Top half

Bottom half

External links
Main Draw
Qualifying Draw

Open Prevadies - Singles
2010 Singles